Paracanthonchus kreisi is a species of nematodes from the Cyatholaimidae family. The scientific name of this species was first published in 1929 by Carl Allgén.

References

Nematodes described in 1929
Chromadorea